Pray for the Wildcats is a 1974 American made-for-television thriller film about a psychopathic business executive chasing his workers on dirtbikes through the desert after he killed a young man. The film was directed by Robert Michael Lewis and starred William Shatner and Andy Griffith, Robert Reed, Marjoe Gortner,  Angie Dickinson, and Lorraine Gary. It originally aired as an ABC Movie of the Week on January 23, 1974.

The film has since gained a cult following, especially due to Griffith's against-type performance as the sadistic villain, a drastic departure following his long run on The Andy Griffith Show. The film would lead Griffith to pursue more villainous roles over the next few years.

Plot summary

Sam Farragut is a sociopathic business executive in Southern California who forces a team of advertising agency employees, Warren Summerfield, Paul McIlvain, and Terry Maxon to embark on a dangerous dirtbike trip to the Baja California desert in order to compete for his business.

Warren Summerfield is a suicidal middle-aged ad executive who has been fired from the agency; the straightlaced Paul McIlvain is inattentive to his wife, and brash art designer, Maxon, feels suddenly trapped after his girlfriend announces she is pregnant. There are numerous long sequences of motorcycle riding on desert backroads.

Summerfield has been having an affair with McIlvian's wife. He has not told his wife that he was fired and is simply serving out his tenure at the agency while looking for a new position. His wife is actually aware of the affair.

Farragut convinces the ad men to make the motorcycle journey on the pretext of looking for a location to shoot a commercial. In reality, Farragut is reckless and looking to involve the men in a spontaneous edgy adventure of his own manipulation. After they leave, McIlvain's wife suspects that Summerfield is planning to kill himself for the insurance money, but she cannot convince Summerfield's wife to instigate a search.

The four men travel deeper into Mexico on isolated dirt roads. At one point Summerfield contemplates plunging off a cliff. After being humiliated by a young American couple in a Baja bar, Farragut tracks them down on the beach while accompanied by Maxon. He tries to offer the young man one hundred dollars in order to sleep with his girlfriend, claiming he is a "hippie with money." Although rebuffed, he persists and is soon fought by the young man.

Although the young man appears to be winning the fight, Farragut seizes an axe and destroys the radiator of the couple's car. After returning to the others, Farragut and Maxon don't inform them of the incident. They are later confronted by the Mexican police who tell them that the young man died trying to hike to safety and that the girl may die as well.

Overnight in the town, Summerfield discovers the truth and tries to convince Maxon and McIlvain to help him turn Farragut in to the police. Maxon, manipulated by Farragut's promise of a promotion in the company, refuses to even admit the truth about Sam's actions, while the conflicted McIlvain resists out of prudency. The next morning, Farragut and Maxon leave on their own for the airport to fly home. They are pursued by Summerfield, who catches up to them. Maxon returns to the town, while Summerfield confronts Farragut, and says he plans to turn Sam into the authorities. Sam, in turn, reveals he knows about Summerfield's firing, life insurance policy, and his plans to commit suicide. When he is unable to either shame or manipulate Summerfield into changing his mind, Farragut pursues Summerfield across the desert in a motorcycle chase, intending to kill him. As Farragut chases Summerfield along a high cliff, Summerfield ditches his bike while Farragut loses control and plunges over the cliff to his fiery death.

The three ad men return to the U.S. with Farragut's remains. McIlvain's wife informs him she wants a divorce. Maxon's girlfriend tells him she is no longer pregnant, implying she has had an abortion. Summerfield, with a new lease on life, is greeted warmly by his wife.

McIlavin, knowing the truth about Summerfield's firing, offers to help him get his job back, but Summerfield refuses. Recognizing McIlavin's compliancy and cowardice, Summerfield lets McIlavin know that no matter how different things may be in the future, Men like them are always going to have to deal with, as Summerfield puts it, the "Sam Farraguts of the world" and what they represent.

Cast
 Andy Griffith as Sam Farragut
 William Shatner as Warren Summerfield
 Robert Reed as Paul McIlvain
 Marjoe Gortner as Terry Maxon
 Angie Dickinson as Nancy McIlvain
 Janet Margolin as Krissie Kincaid
 Lorraine Gary as Lila Summerfield
 John Barbour as Howard Norlan
 Robert Burton as Michael (as Skip Burton)
 Marilyn Hearn as Loris
 William Wintersole as Mr. Perrins
 Paul Kent as Dr. Harris
 John Brascia as Captain Guiterrez

Production
It was mainly shot in the Baja California desert, although the Mexican town scenes were shot on location at Old Tucson.

Home media
The film was released in 1987 on video by Republic Pictures Home Video. Its running time is 100 minutes.

The film was released on DVD as part of a set called "Movies for the Man Cave 4."  It is also available on a four-movie compilation DVD called, "Andy Griffith Collection:  America's Favorite Actor."

External links
 
 

1974 television films
1974 films
ABC Movie of the Week
1970s thriller films
American thriller films
Films set in Mexico
Films shot in Tucson, Arizona
Motorcycling films
Films directed by Robert Michael Lewis
1970s American films